Michele Henson (born August 29, 1946) is an American politician who served in the Georgia House of Representatives from 1991 to 2021.

References

1946 births
Living people
Democratic Party members of the Georgia House of Representatives
Politicians from Boston
21st-century American politicians
21st-century American women politicians
Women state legislators in Georgia (U.S. state)